Kampta Karran (died June 5, 2013) was a Guyanese sociologist and author. Karran had a distinguished record in the service of local publishing in Guyana, where he edited and published the journal Offerings and was active in working towards a resolution to Guyana's ethnic conflicts. He lectured at the University of Birmingham from 1999 to 2002, before joining the  University of Warwick Centre for Research in Ethnic Relations as the Warwick Postgraduate Research Fellow in 2002. He also lectured at the University of Guyana.

Karran died at Skeldon Hospital in Guyana on June 5, 2013. He was survived by his wife and four children.

Works 

 Race and Ethnicity in Guyana: An Introductory Reader
 No Land, No Mother - Editors Lynn Macedo and Kampta Karran. 2007, Peepal Tree Press.

References

Alumni of the University of Warwick
Year of birth missing
2013 deaths
Guyanese writers
Academics of the University of Birmingham